Benedek is a Hungarian name which can be either a surname or a given name. It is the Hungarian name equivalent to Benedict. It may refer to:

Surname
 Dalma Ružičić-Benedek (born 1982), a Hungarian-born Serbian sprint canoer
 David Benedek (born 1980), a former German-American professional snowboarder
 Dvir Benedek (born 1969), an Israeli actor, and chairman of the Israeli screen actors union Shaham
 Elek Benedek(1859-1929),  a Hungarian journalist and writer
 Elissa P. Benedek, an American clinical professor of psychiatry
 Emily Benedek, an American journalist and author
 Gábor Benedek (born 1927), a Hungarian modern pentathlete and Olympic champion
 George Benedek, an American physicist 
 János Benedek (born 1944), a Hungarian former weightlifter and Olympic athlete
 Jim Benedek (1941–2009), a Hungarian-American soccer (association football) forward
 Joana Benedek (born 1972), a Romanian-Mexican actress 
 László Benedek (1905–1992), a Hungarian-American film director and cinematographer
 Ludwig von Benedek (1804–1881), an Austrian general
 Therese Benedek, (1892-1977), a Hungarian-American psychoanalyst, researcher, and educator
 Tibor Benedek (born 1972), a retired Hungarian water polo player and 3-time Olympic gold medalist

Given name
 Benedek I, Archbishop of Esztergom (died 1055), a Hungarian prelate who served as Archbishop of Kalocsa from 1035 to 1046 and as Archbishop of Esztergom between 1046 and 1055
 Benedek Cseszneky de Milvány et Csesznek, a Hungarian nobleman in the 17th century
 Benedek Eszterhas (1508-1553), a Hungarian nobleman
 Benedek Fliegauf (born 1974), a Hungarian film director and screenwriter
 Benedek Jávor (born 1972), a Hungarian politician
 Benedek Oláh (born 1991),  a Finnish table tennis player, and Olympic athlete
 Benedek Váradi (born 1995),  a Hungarian basketball player

Other uses
 Benedek Broadcasting, a former American television broadcast company